Sisona is a genus of moths belonging to the subfamily Olethreutinae of the family Tortricidae. It contains only one species, Sisona albitibiana, which is found in south-east Asia, including Vietnam., China, Japan, Thailand, New Guinea, Borneo, Java and Sulawesi.

The forewings are whitish-fuscous touched with tawny along the costa. The hindwings are light tawny-fuscous.

Subspecies
There are three recognised subspecies, including:
Sisona albitibiana albitibiana
Sisona albitibiana rubida Diakonoff, 1971 (eastern Borneo, Thailand, Vietnam)

See also
List of Tortricidae genera

References

External links
tortricidae.com

Olethreutini
Monotypic moth genera
Moths of Asia
Tortricidae genera